Internet Explorer 10 (IE10) is the tenth, and by now, discontinued, version of the Internet Explorer web browser and the successor to Internet Explorer 9, released by Microsoft on September 4, 2012, shortly after the completion of Windows Server 2012. It was the default browser that shipped with Windows 8 and Windows Server 2012 and can replace previous versions of Internet Explorer on Windows 7 and Windows Server 2008 R2 but unlike version 9, this version doesn't support Windows Vista, Windows Server 2008 or earlier.

IE10 expands on Internet Explorer 9 functionality with regard to CSS3 support, hardware acceleration, and HTML5 support. On Windows 8, it is divided into two editions with different user interfaces: a Metro app that does not support plug-ins and a traditional desktop application that retains plug-in support. On 64-bit computers, the Metro edition runs in 64-bit mode by default. The desktop edition can be run in 64-bit mode by enabling Enhanced Protected Mode.

Product life cycle 
On April 12, 2011, Microsoft released the first "IE10 Platform Preview", which runs only on Windows 7 and later. While the second platform preview was also available for Windows 7 and later, the next four platform previews ran only on Windows 8. The first preview release came four weeks after the final release of Internet Explorer 9. IE10 reached general availability on September 4, 2012 as a component of Windows Server 2012. IE10 was included with the release of Windows 8 on October 26, 2012. A preview of IE10 for Windows 7 was made available for download on November 5, 2012. On November 13, 2012, Internet Explorer 10 and the Platform Update were made available for download to all Windows 7 and Windows Server 2008 R2 users. Windows Vista and earlier are not supported.

Support for Internet Explorer 10 on most Windows versions ended on January 12, 2016 when Microsoft began requiring customers to use the latest version of Internet Explorer available for each Windows version. On January 31, 2020, Microsoft released the final IE10 update for Windows Server 2012 and Windows Embedded 8 Standard, marking the end of IE10 support on all platforms.

History
Internet Explorer 10 was first announced on April 12, 2011 at the MIX 11 conference in Las Vegas. In this conference, Microsoft showcased a demo version of Internet Explorer 10 along with a demo version of Windows 8. On the same day, a Platform Preview of Internet Explorer 10 was released on the Microsoft Internet Explorer Test Drive website. It only supports Windows 7; later platform previews only support Windows 8.
Internet Explorer 10 Platform Preview 1 supports CSS3 grid layout, CSS3 flexible box layout, CSS3 multi-column layout, CSS3 gradient, and full hardware acceleration.

Reviewers' responses to the release of Internet Explorer 10 Platform Preview were varied; however, they noted how soon (29 days) after the release of Internet Explorer 9 Microsoft began talking about the next version. While Don Reisinger of eWeek listed his requested features for the next version, Michael Muchmore of PC Magazine tested Platform Preview 1's performance and HTML5 support with both Microsoft's and third parties' test suites. In his test, Platform Preview 1 performed better than Internet Explorer 9 but not always better than the competing web browsers.

On September 13, 2011, Microsoft released the developer preview of Windows 8 to the general public, which came with Internet Explorer Developer Preview (the first full browser incarnation of Internet Explorer 10). Although Internet Explorer is the last major web browser among Mozilla Firefox, Google Chrome, Opera, and Safari to support spell checking, it is the first desktop browser on Windows to support autocorrection.

Internet Explorer 10 was released to manufacturing along with Windows 8 and Windows Server 2012. The latter reached general availability on September 4, 2012 while the former reached general availability on October 26, 2012. A preview of Internet Explorer 10 for Windows 7 and Windows Server 2008 R2 was released on November 13, 2012. It is not compatible with previous versions of Windows.

New features

Adobe Flash integration
On Windows 8, Internet Explorer 10 includes a built-in Adobe Flash Player. Microsoft and Adobe worked together to ensure that the version of Adobe Flash included with Internet Explorer 10 does not drain the battery or impact performance in negative ways.
In the "Metro" version of Internet Explorer, only some of the features of Adobe Flash will be included for battery life, performance and security purposes. Some features that do not work well with touch have also been removed from the "Metro" version of Internet Explorer. However, originally, not all websites can use Adobe Flash in the "Metro" version of Internet Explorer as Microsoft and Adobe maintain a list of approved websites that are, reportedly, video content and some games.
In the desktop version of Internet Explorer 10, all of the features of Adobe Flash are available.

On March 12, 2013 Microsoft changed this behavior from allowing only sites on a whitelist to display flash content, to allowing all sites to display flash content except those on a curated Compatibility View (CV) list (blacklist) maintained by Microsoft.

User interface
The desktop version of Internet Explorer 10 (available for Windows 7 and Windows 8) retains the user interface (UI) of Internet Explorer 9 with minor refinements, such as removing gradients. The Metro version of Internet Explorer 10 (available on Windows 8) includes a new UI, most of which is hidden so that the webpage being viewed takes up the entire screen.

The UI can be revealed by a right click of the mouse or by a swipe from the top or bottom edges of a touchscreen. When the UI is shown, the tabs are listed on the top of the screen, with a small preview of the webpage on each tab. A button to add a new tab is placed in the top-right corner. At the bottom of the screen, the address bar and navigational buttons are shown. Navigational buttons include the Back button (to navigate to the previous page), the Refresh button (to reload active page), the Pin button (which create a new shortcut tile for the active page on the Start screen), and a wrench-shaped icon, which opens the only menu of IE10. It contains options such as "View on Desktop", which opens the current webpage on the desktop version of Internet Explorer 10, and "Find on page", which can find a text string (a word, phrase or arbitrary set of letters) in the active page.

Flip Ahead
Internet Explorer 10 also introduces a new feature called Flip Ahead. This works in both Metro and desktop versions of Internet Explorer 10. It allows users to move through articles that span multiple pages as well as search results and other web pages with a "next page" or similar button. This feature is turned off by default as a user's browsing history is sent to Microsoft in order to provide the feature.
According to the Windows SuperSite, Microsoft has said that some sites may need to be updated to ensure it will work as intended.

Miscellaneous 
Internet Explorer 10 is the first web browser to support smooth CSS transitions of linear gradients.

Release history

Discontinued features
Internet Explorer 10 no longer features or supports the following:
 Conditional comments in HTML (JavaScript conditional comments still work)
 DirectX-based filters and transitions (DX filters)
 Element behaviors and HTML Components (HTCs)
 XML data islands
 Vector Markup Language (VML)
 Content Advisor (taken over by Windows Parental Controls or Microsoft Family Safety)

Mobile version

At the Windows Phone Developer Summit in June 2012, Joe Belfiore announced Windows Phone 8 due towards the end of 2012, which will include a mobile version of Internet Explorer 10 that offers four times faster JavaScript performance and two times more support for HTML 5 features. It includes Microsoft SmartScreen and supports touch in HTML5 apps.

User agent string
Internet Explorer 10 has a new user agent string which has the following general format:
Mozilla/5.0 (compatible; MSIE 10.0; Windows NT 6.2; [platform token] Trident/6.0; Touch)

Depending on the system, different parts of this user string may change. The last token, "Touch", only appears on systems equipped with a touchscreen. The platform token may be any of the following:

Notes
A. Refers to the Internet Explorer (engine) version, not the Platform Preview version
B. Platform Preview version is 2 October 1000.16394
C. Platform Preview version is 2 October 1008.16421
D. This version is only included as part of Windows 8 Developer Preview, and is a full version rather than a usual Platform Preview.
E. Platform Preview version is 2.10.0.8103.0. Does not replace Internet Explorer Developer Preview included in Windows 8. This Platform Preview is compatible only with Windows Developer Preview.

References

External links
 
 Internet Explorer Test Drive
 IEBlog: Windows Internet Explorer Engineering Team Blog at MSDN Blogs
 Eric Law's IE Internals at MSDN Blogs
 Exploring IE: A Blog for Internet Explorer Customers at The Windows Blog
 Internet Explorer Community Resources at Microsoft Developer Network

2012 software
Internet Explorer
Windows web browsers
Windows 8
Windows components

th:อินเทอร์เน็ตเอกซ์พลอเรอร์#อินเทอร์เน็ตเอกซ์พลอเรอร์ 10